Bangladeshki Sana Tampha is a 2020 multi-starrer Indian Meitei language film directed by OC Meira and produced by Rakesh Naorem and Ibungohal Shyamal, under the banner of Ipak Films. Portraying the lifestyle of Meiteis in Bangladesh, the film stars Gurumayum Bonny, Abenao Elangbam, Bala Tensubam, Narmada Sougaijam, Gepelina Mayanglambam and Ashok Seleibam in the lead roles. The movie was released at Manipur State Film Development Society (MSFDS) on 25 January 2020.

Cast
 Gurumayum Bonny
 Abenao Elangbam
 Bala Tensubam as Sana
 Narmada Sougaijam as Tampha
 Gepelina Mayanglambam
 Ashok Seleibam
 Shilviya
 Khoirom Loya

Accolades
The movie bagged three awards at the 13th Manipur State Film Awards 2020.

Soundtrack
Nanao Sagolmang composed the songs for the movie and Manaobi MM and OC Meira wrote the lyrics. The film has two songs.

See also 
 List of Meitei-language films

References 

Meitei-language films
2020 films